Khidry is a village in the Brest Voblast of Belarus.

Singer Yuriy Vaschuk was born in Khidry.

References

Populated places in Brest Region
Grodno Governorate
Polesie Voivodeship